Michael Baig-Clifford is a BAFTA-award-winning filmmaker.

External links
Michael B. Clifford on IMDb
 http://michaelbclifford.co.uk/ Michael B. Clifford official website

References

Living people
Year of birth missing (living people)